Dragove (San Leonardo, Porto Dragon, Villa Dragova in Italian) is a village in the north-eastern part of the island of Dugi Otok (Long Island) in Zadar County, Croatia. Dragove is located on the regional road running along the entire island. The population is 35 (census 2011).

The surroundings were populated as early as antique times (Roman remains below the hill of Dumbovica), while the first Croatian settlement was mentioned in the sources already in the 14th century. Later, many Croats settled in Dragove fleeing the Turkish invasions of Bosnia. The Drago family from Zadar had its estates here, purchased in the 15th century by another Zadar family, the Salomonis. The parish church of St. Leonardo was built in the 12th and 13th century. The small church of Our Lady of Dumbovica, mentioned in the 15th century, is on a beautiful location, with a nice view on the surroundings. During the 1950s Dragove's population reached about 500 people.

References

Populated places in Zadar County
Dugi Otok